Heaven Is Gone is the first studio album by American heavy metal band Seventh Void.

It sold around 1,800 copies in the United States in its first week of release, peaking at number 21 on the Billboard Top Heatseekers chart. A music video was released for "Heaven Is Gone". Later, band friend Slitzy created a music video for "Last Walk in the Light" featuring live footage of the band. When the album was re-released through Napalm Records in 2010 it received a new cover artwork.

Track listing
All tracks written by Matt Brown and Kenny Hickey
 "Closing In" – 3:59
 "Heaven Is Gone" – 4:37
 "The End of All Time" – 4:49
 "Broken Sky" – 3:13
 "Killing You Slow" – 4:58
 "Descent" – 4:10
 "Shadow on Me" – 4:09
 "Drown Inside" – 3:32
 "Death of a Junkie" – 5:41
 "Last Walk in the Light" – 3:11

Personnel 
Kenny Hickey – vocals, lead guitar
Hank Hell – bass
Johnny Kelly – drums

Former members
Matt Brown – guitar, production, engineering

References 

2009 debut albums
Seventh Void albums